Moradabad (also Romanized as Morādābād; also known as Morādābād-e Meyqān, Morādābād-e Mīqān, Morād-e Mīghān, and Murādābād) is a village in Mashhad-e Miqan Rural District, in the Central District of Arak County, Markazi Province, Iran. At the 2006 census, its population was 185, in 53 families.

References 

Populated places in Arak County